Edgar Roberts Mobbs  (1882–1917) was an English rugby union footballer who played for and captained Northampton R.F.C. and England. He played as a three quarter. Mobbs is commemorated in the Ella-Mobbs Trophy, first competed for by the Australia and England rugby union teams in the 2022 series.

Life
Edgar Roberts Mobbs was born on 29 June 1882 in Northampton, England, the son of Oliver L. and Elizabeth Anne Mobbs. A brother was Noel Mobbs (1878–1959), founder of Slough Estates. He was educated at Bedford Modern School where the name of a house commemorates him.

After initially being turned down as too old to join the army in the First World War, Mobbs raised his own "sportsman's" company of 250 sportsmen (also known as Mobbs' Own) for the Northamptonshire Regiment. He rose to command his battalion (7th (Service) Battalion, Northamptonshire Regiment) with the rank of lieutenant colonel.  He was awarded the Distinguished Service Order in the 1917 New Year Honours. 

Mobbs was killed in action, on 31 July 1917, at Zillebeke, Belgium, during the Third Battle of Ypres, while attacking a machine gun post.  His body has not been found, so his name is on the Menin Gate memorial. Mobbs is also commemorated with a bust in Northampton.

In 1921 the first Mobbs' Memorial Match was held between the East Midlands RFU and the Barbarians at Franklin's Gardens. In 2008 the Barbarians played Bedford Blues in the Mobbs Memorial Match at Goldington Road and did so again in 2009. The final Mobbs Match to feature the Barbarians took place in April 2011 against Bedford. The fixture continues to be played with the Army Rugby Union facing Bedford and Northampton Saints in alternate years and the game helps to raise money for youth rugby in the area.

Edgar Mobbs Way, a road in Northampton, close to Franklin's Gardens stadium, is named after him. A band from Northampton have named themselves The Mobbs after Edgar Mobbs.

See also 

 List of England rugby union footballers killed in the World Wars

References

External links 

 History of the Raising of the 7th (Service) Battalion, Northamptonshire Regiment
 sportnetwork article
 Roll of Honour article
 Comprehensive article
 

1882 births
1917 deaths
English rugby union players
England international rugby union players
Northampton Saints players
Northamptonshire Regiment officers
Companions of the Distinguished Service Order
British military personnel killed in World War I
British Army personnel of World War I
Barbarian F.C.
Barbarian F.C. players
People educated at Bedford Modern School
Rugby union players from Northampton
Rugby union wings